South Congress Transit Center is a Capital Metropolitan Transportation Authority bus station in Austin, Texas. It is located off of Radam Lane on the south side of Ben White Boulevard, just west of South Congress Avenue in the SoCo area of Austin, Texas. The station features a park and ride lot and is served by several local bus routes as well as MetroRapid Route 801. As part of Project Connect, a Capital MetroRail light rail station is expected to be built at the facility; it is planned to be the second-to-last stop of the Orange Line before terminating at Stassney station, and will be the final station of the Gold Line.

References

External links
 via Capital Metropolitan Transportation Authority

Future Capital MetroRail stations
Bus stations in Texas
Buildings and structures in Austin, Texas
Proposed railway stations in the United States
Railway stations scheduled to open in 2029